Gnetum is a genus of gymnosperms, the sole genus in the family Gnetaceae within the Gnetophyta. They are tropical evergreen trees, shrubs and lianas. Unlike other gymnosperms, they possess vessel elements in the xylem. Some species have been proposed to have been the first plants to be insect-pollinated as their fossils occur in association with extinct pollinating scorpionflies. Molecular phylogenies based on nuclear and plastid sequences from most of the species indicate hybridization among some of the Southeast Asian species. Fossil-calibrated molecular-clocks suggest that the Gnetum lineages now found in Africa, South America and Southeast Asia are the result of ancient long-distance dispersal across seawater.

Their leaves are rich in bioactive compounds such as flavonoids and stilbenes. Of the species studied so far, Gnetum have photosynthetic and transpiration capacities which are considerably lower than those of other seed plants, due to the absence of multiple chloroplast genes essential for photosynthesis, a trait they seem to share with the other living members of Gnetophyta, Ephedra and Welwitschia, as well as conifers. There are over 50 different species of Gnetum.

Species

There are over 50 different species of Gnetum.
Gnetum sect. Gnetum
Gnetum subsect. Gnetum - 2 species of trees; Southeast Asia, Pacific Islands
Gnetum gnemon - Tibet, Yunnan, Assam, Indochina, Nicobar Islands, Malaysia, Indonesia, Philippines, New Guinea, Melanesia, Micronesia
Gnetum costatum - New Guinea, Solomon Islands
Gnetum subsect. Micrognemones - 2 species of lianas; tropical west Africa
Gnetum africanum - central Africa from Cameroon to Angola
Gnetum buchholzianum - central Africa from Nigeria to Zaire
Gnetum subsect. Araeognemones - 9 species of lianas; tropical South America and Central America - Ituá
Gnetum camporum - Venezuela
Gnetum leyboldii - Costa Rica, Panama, Venezuela, Colombia, Ecuador, Peru, Amazonian Brazil
Gnetum nodiflorum - Guianas, Venezuela, Colombia, Ecuador, Peru, northwestern Brazil
Gnetum paniculatum - Guianas, Venezuela, northwestern Brazil
Gnetum schwackeanum - Amazonas State of southern Venezuela, northwestern Brazil
Gnetum urens - Guianas, Venezuela, Peru, northwestern Brazil
Gnetum venosum - Bolívar State of southern Venezuela, northwestern Brazil
Gnetum sect. Scandentia [Gnetum sect. Cylindrostachys] - about 20 species of lianas; southern Asia
Gnetum subsect. Stipitati
Gnetum arboreum - Luzon in Philippines
Gnetum contractum - southern India
Gnetum edule - southern India
Gnetum gracilipes - Yunnan + Guangxi in China
Gnetum latifolium - Assam, much of Southeast Asia, New Guinea, Bismarck Archipelago
Gnetum montanum - Himalayas, southern China, northern Indochina
Gnetum oblongum - Bangladesh, Myanmar
Gnetum pendulum - Tibet, southern China
Gnetum tenuifolium - Peninsular Malaysia, Thailand, Sumatra
Gnetum ula
Gnetum subsect. Sessiles
Gnetum acutum - Sarawak
Gnetum bosavicum - Papua New Guinea
Gnetum catasphaericum - southern China
Gnetum cleistostachyum - southern China
Gnetum cuspidatum - Indochina, Indonesia, Malaysia, Philippines
Gnetum diminutum - Borneo
Gnetum formosum - Vietnam
Gnetum giganteum - Guangxi in China
Gnetum globosum - Pahang in Malaysia
Gnetum gnemonoides - New Guinea, Bismarck Archipelago, Indonesia, Philippines
Gnetum hainanense - southern China
Gnetum klossii - Sabah
Gnetum leptostachyum - Laos, Thailand, Vietnam, Borneo
Gnetum loerzingii - Sumatra
Gnetum luofuense - Fujian, Guangdong, Jiangxi 
Gnetum macrostachyum - Indochina, Indonesia, Malaysia, New Guinea
Gnetum microcarpum - Myanmar, Thailand, Malaysia, Borneo, Sumatra
Gnetum neglectum - Borneo
Gnetum oxycarpum - Sumatra
Gnetum parvifolium - Laos, Vietnam, southern China
Gnetum raya - Borneo
Gnetum ridleyi - Peninsular Malaysia

Uses
Many Gnetum species are edible, with the seeds being roasted, and the foliage used as a leaf vegetable. The plant is harvested and yields a useful fiber. There is no sense of danger in consuming the fruit or the seeds.

There is also a study done on the plant to see if it has any medicinal properties, finding some anti-coagulation effects due to its stilbenoid content. The family Gnetaceae is well known as a rich source of plant-derived stilbenoids as well as Cyperaceae, Dipterocarpaceae, Fabaceae, and Vitaceae.

Conservation 
Some species of Gnetum are in danger of dying out. The habitats are being removed with the trees being cut down to create industry. The tropical rainforest are being destroyed so many of the species are going extinct such as Gnetum oxycarpum. The rainforests are being torn down and being turned into farmland. Gnetum live in only a small part of the rainforest.

Gallery

References

External links

Gymnosperm Database - Gnetum
Sorting Gnetum names
Uses of Gnetum in Africa (FAO) 
Kloypan, Chiraphat & Jeenapongsa, Rattima & Sri-In, Piyawit & Chanta, Surin & Dokpuang, Dech & Tip-Pyang, Santi & Surapinit, Serm. (2012). Stilbenoids from Gnetum macrostachyum Attenuate Human Platelet Aggregation and Adhesion. Phytotherapy research : PTR. 26. 1564-8. 10.1002/ptr.4605. 
https://bsapubs.onlinelibrary.wiley.com/doi/abs/10.1002/j.1537-2197.1916.tb05408.x 
http://www.theplantlist.org/tpl1.1/record/kew-334161...

Gnetaceae
Medicinal plants
Dioecious plants
Gymnosperm genera